Vetrovala Peak is the rocky peak rising to 983 m in the south part of Aldomir Ridge on southern Trinity Peninsula in Graham Land, Antarctica.  It is situated at the head of Sjögren Inlet between the termini of Sjögren and Boydell Glaciers. An offshoot of the peak forms Royak Point.

The peak is named after Vetrovala site in Vitosha Mountain, Western Bulgaria.

Location

Maps
 Antarctic Digital Database (ADD). Scale 1:250000 topographic map of Antarctica. Scientific Committee on Antarctic Research (SCAR), 1993–2016.

Notes

References
 Vetrovala Peak. SCAR Composite Antarctic Gazetteer.
 Bulgarian Antarctic Gazetteer. Antarctic Place-names Commission. (details in Bulgarian, basic data in English)

External links
 Vetrovala Peak. Copernix satellite image

Mountains of Trinity Peninsula
Bulgaria and the Antarctic